The Embassy of the Islamic Republic of Iran in Ottawa, Ontario, Canada is the former diplomatic mission of Iranian government. It was located at 245 Metcalfe Street in the Centretown neighbourhood of Ottawa, across the street from the Booth House, currently home to the Laurentian Leadership Centre.  Iran moved into the facilities in the summer of 1991; previously they had been based in a building on Roosevelt Avenue in Ottawa's west end.  The ambassador lived in a house on Acacia Avenue in Rockcliffe Park, near Stornoway.

On September 7, 2012, the Canadian government announced it would expel all remaining Iranian diplomats in Canada within five days. As of September 17, 2012, Canadian interests in Iran are represented by the Italian Embassy in Tehran and the Canadian Embassy in Ankara.

Attack
On April 5, 1992, the embassy was stormed by a group of Iranian exiles linked to the Mujahideen-e Khalq (MEK). No one was seriously injured in the raid but the mob ransacked and destroyed much of the interior. Most of those responsible were later arrested.

The relationship between Iran and Canada has been strained in recent years due to a number of issues, including Iran's nuclear program and human rights abuses in Iran. In 2012, Canada closed its embassy in Tehran and expelled Iranian diplomats from Canada, citing concerns over the safety of Canadian diplomats in Iran and Iran's support for terrorist organizations. Iran responded by closing its embassy in Ottawa and expelling Canadian diplomats from Iran.

See also
Canada–Iran relations

References

External links
Official web site of Embassy of the Islamic Republic of Iran in Canada

Iran
Ottawa
Canada–Iran relations